Julia Catherine Vincent (born 13 August 1994) is a South African professional female diver.

She competed at the 2015 World Aquatics Championships.  She was a student-athlete at the University of South Carolina and qualified for the 2016 Summer Olympics in the 3-meter springboard. At the 2016 Summer Olympics, she finished in 29th place in the preliminary and did not advance to the semifinals. She also qualified for the 2020 Summer Olympics in the 3-meter springboard.

See also
 South Africa at the 2015 World Aquatics Championships

References

External links
Gamecocksonline
Dailygamecock
the-sports.org
sc.edu
iol.co.za
 Getty Images

South African female divers
Living people
Place of birth missing (living people)
1994 births
Divers at the 2016 Summer Olympics
Divers at the 2018 Commonwealth Games
Olympic divers of South Africa
Commonwealth Games competitors for South Africa
Divers at the 2020 Summer Olympics
South Carolina Gamecocks athletes